Immaculate Memories: The Uncluttered Worlds of Christopher Pratt is a Canadian documentary film, directed by Kenneth J. Harvey and released in 2018. The film profiles artist Christopher Pratt.

The film premiered at the Nickel Film Festival in June 2018, before airing as an episode of the CBC Television documentary series Absolutely Canadian.

The film received a Canadian Screen Award nomination for Best Feature Length Documentary at the 7th Canadian Screen Awards in 2019.

References

External links
 

2018 films
2018 documentary films
Canadian documentary films
Documentary films about painters
2010s English-language films
2010s Canadian films